"Undertow" is the fifth episode of the second season of the HBO original series The Wire. The episode was written by Ed Burns from a story by David Simon & Ed Burns and was directed by Steve Shill. It originally aired on June 29, 2003.

Plot
Rawls puts Freamon on the Sobotka detail and recommends that Bunk bring in a fresh detective as a partner on the case. Bunk, Beadie, and Cole serve grand jury summons on checkers in Frank's stevedores union, including Johnny Fifty and Horseface, as part of the investigation into the Jane Does. Frank is enraged that the detectives believe he knew anything about the dead girls. Bunk learns that the hearings brought little information and that Beadie has no informants at the port. Later, Beadie visits Maui, who turns out to be an old flame, and sounds him out about becoming an informant. He refuses to give her information on his fellow union men but offers a tip: the union computers may be useful in tracking containers.

Bubbles visits the marine unit and informs McNulty that he has tracked down Omar. McNulty brings Omar in to be interviewed by Ilene Nathan in preparation for Bird's trial. Nathan is surprised at Omar's candor and history, but calls him a sociopath and worries about putting him on the stand in front of Levy. She gives McNulty a voucher to buy Omar some more appropriate clothes for his court appearance. Later, McNulty asks Special Agent Cleary, his contact in the INS, if he can interview any vice suspects about his floater. Cleary finds some girls being held in New Jersey, but finds it hard to understand McNulty's desire to identify the girl. After traveling to New Jersey, McNulty questions them but gets no response since he can't promise to keep them from being deported.

Daniels offers Carver a position in the Sobotka detail, reasoning that Carver is unlikely to betray the team again after previously being caught. However, Daniels tells Carver that he will not be recognized as a sergeant and will report to Greggs. Herc is overjoyed to be working with Carver again. Daniels orders DNRs and finance investigations to be done quickly to placate Valchek, and has Greggs, Herc and Carver look into the drug trade around the port. Freamon arrives and surprises the detail by recognizing Frank from a photo, noting his link to the Jane Does. As they set up their operation, the detectives find that the dealers in the port area are much less organized than the Barksdales. Meanwhile, Valchek receives another photo of his missing surveillance van, this time from San Diego.

Donette visits D'Angelo, telling him that Stringer has been supporting her and will do the same for D'Angelo when he is released. D'Angelo is cynical about Stringer's motivations. In the pit, Poot Carr tries to restrain his dealers when an addict disparages the product sold to him. Bodie says that someone needs to tell Stringer about the product's low quality. Stringer attends his economics class at the Baltimore City Community College and asks his teacher, Mr. Lucas, about selling an "inferior product" in a competitive marketplace. Lucas advises decreasing his prices to increase market share but warns that the product will lose credibility if the price is continually low. He also gives Stringer an example of a company CEO facing that exact problem, the solution being a change of name. After visiting Avon in prison, Stringer hosts a meeting with Barksdale dealers to solicit ideas for solving the organization's problems.

Ziggy arrives to collect money from a drug dealer named Frog, who comes short and claims his stash was stolen. Ziggy threatens him, but Frog remains indifferent. As Ziggy drives away, he is blocked by Proposition Joe's nephew, Melvin "Cheese" Wagstaff, and is confronted over a debt. Cheese and his men then shake down Ziggy and become frustrated when they find very little money on him. Ziggy offers his leather jacket as partial payment, but Cheese rejects the offer and threatens to kill him if the debt is not paid by Friday. Cheese and his men then proceed to take Ziggy's car. Meanwhile, Nick views a house with Aimee; the realtor turns out to be McNulty's ex-wife Elena. Nick initially refuses to help Ziggy deal with Cheese until he realizes his cousin is in danger, but is still unable to help Ziggy since he has already given his share of their take to Aimee for a rented apartment.

Nick asks Vondas and Serge to put their smuggling on hold while Frank deals with the Jane Doe investigation. Vondas asks Nick about smuggling chemicals but is evasive when Nick asks what they will be used for. Nick and La La negotiate with Cheese, asking for the return of Ziggy's car so it can be sold to raise money. Cheese offers another week, but shows Nick that his crew has already torched Ziggy's car. The Greek tells Vondas that he won't meet with Frank, but will double his payment. Frank is dismissive of the offer but is forced to ponder the fate of his union if he cuts ties with The Greek. At the library, Nick and Ziggy learn that the chemicals that Vondas asked for are used for processing cocaine. Nick tells Vondas and Serge that he is happy to deal as long as the chemicals are only used for narcotics. They tell Nick that they will triple their payment if Frank agrees to continue working with them, but Frank is defiant when confronted with the offer.

Production

Title reference
The title refers to the tide effect that traps unsuspecting swimmers; a metaphor for Frank Sobotka's inability to extricate himself from the smuggling operation despite his desire to.

Epigraph

Vondas makes this comment as a veiled criticism of Frank's caution in pursuing further deals with The Greeks' organization when faced with a police investigation. The season's theme of industrial decay is also thereby continued.

Credits

Starring cast
Although credited, Deirdre Lovejoy does not appear in this episode.

Guest stars
Seth Gilliam as Detective Ellis Carver
Domenick Lombardozzi as Detective Thomas "Herc" Hauk
Jim True-Frost as Detective Roland "Prez" Pryzbylewski
James Ransone as Ziggy Sobotka
Pablo Schreiber as Nick Sobotka
Callie Thorne as Elena McNulty
J.D. Williams as Preston "Boadie" Broadus
Michael K. Williams as Omar Little
Al Brown as Major Stan Valchek
Richard Burton as Sean "Shamrock" McGinty
Kristin Proctor as Aimee
Bill Raymond as The Greek
Shamyl Brown as Donette
Tray Chaney as Malik "Poot" Carr
Luray Cooper as Nat Coxson
Lance Irwin as Maui
Susan Rome as ASA Ilene Nathan
Chris Ashworth as Sergei Malatov
Jeffrey Fugitt as Officer Claude Diggins
Method Man as Melvin "Cheese" Wagstaff 
Charley Scalies as Thomas "Horseface" Pakusa
Gary "D. Reign" Senkus as Frog

Uncredited appearances
Gary D'Addario as Grand Jury Prosecutor Gary DiPasquale
Jeffrey Pratt Gordon as Johnny "Fifty" Spamanto
Kelvin Davis as La La
De'Rodd Hearns as Puddin
Robert F. Colesberry as Ray Cole
Kevin Murray as Special Agent Cleary
Unknown as Detective Massy
Daniel Ross as Drug Dealer
Lev Gorn as Eton Ben-Eleazer
Mark Kochanowicz as Yuppie Husband

First appearances
Frog: An East side drug dealer who sometimes works for Ziggy Sobotka
Cheese Wagstaff : Nephew of Eastside drug kingpin Proposition Joe and a feared lieutenant in his operation.

References and notes
Cheese's given name was originally listed on the HBO website as "Calvin" before being changed to "Melvin".''

External links
"Undertow" at HBO.com

The Wire (season 2) episodes
2003 American television episodes